Spilt Milk is the debut album by Kristina Train, released on October 20, 2009. Her record label at the time, Blue Note Records, had initially been interested in pairing Train with Norah Jones producer Lee Alexander, but instead she went to London in 2007 and asked Jimmy Hogarth to produce the album. Train cowrote eight songs on the album, collaborating with Hogarth, Eg White, and Ed Harcourt. Train also arranged and overdubbed strings on three tracks on Spilt Milk. The extended version of the release contains the Carolyn Franklin & Jimmy Radcliffe song "If You Want Me".

In 2016 Lorrie Morgan covered the album's title track on her album Letting Go...Slow.

Track listing

References

External links

2009 albums